Ismadi bin Mukhtar (born 16 December 1983) is a Singapore international footballer who plays as a right wing-back for S.League club Warriors.

Career
Ismadi plied his trade in the S.League with Woodlands Wellington as his first club, After spending two years with the Rams, Ismadi went on to join league champions Tampines Rovers in 2010.

Since his journey with the Stags, he has won a total of three S.League medals (2011, 2012, 2013) and a Singapore Cup runners-up medal (2012).

In 2014, he was recalled to the national team to participate in the 2014 AFF Championship.

References

1983 births
Living people
Singaporean footballers
Woodlands Wellington FC players
Tampines Rovers FC players
Singapore Premier League players
Singapore international footballers
Association football defenders